Stela is a Romanian feminine given name. Notable persons with that name include:

Stela Perin (born 1934), Romanian artistic gymnast
Stela Popa (born 1982), Moldovan journalist and author
Stela Popescu (born 1935), Romanian actress
Stela Posavec (born 1996), Croatian handball player
Stela Pura (born 1971), Romanian swimmer
Stela Namar (born 1978), Swiss fashion designer

Croatian feminine given names
Romanian feminine given names